Veera Kankanam is a 1957 Telugu-language swashbuckler film, produced by T. R. Sundaram under the Modern Theatres banner and directed by G. R. Rao. It stars N. T. Rama Rao, Krishna Kumari and Jamuna, with music composed by Susarla Dakshinamurthi. 
The film is a remake of the 1950 Tamil Historical fiction film Manthiri Kumari.

Plot
The film begins in a kingdom Mallesena ruled by King Vengallaraya Deva (Ramana Reddy) a marionette in hands of malevolent Rajaguru (Gummadi) who executes the entire administration. Parallelly, his son Chandrasena (Jaggayya) a barbarous person, forms a decoits team in a veil, to capture the kingdom. Right now, he creates anarchy & irregularity in the country, so, the King appoints Chief Commander Veera Mohan (N. T. Rama Rao) to dump out the turbulence. At present, Veera Mohan awakes the valor in public and makes them wear warrior bands Veerakankanam as a symbol. During that crunch, Rajaguru gets back Chandrasena to the fort when he tries to trap princess Rajani (Krishna Kumari) and sends a love letter. But unfortunately, it goes into the hands of Parvathi (Jamuna) daughter of Maha Mantri (K.V.S.Sarma), and starts loving him. Meanwhile, Veera Mohan & Rajani fall for each other. Eventually, Veera Mohan recognizes Chandrasena as the viper and stands him as a victim before the court. Here, the King empowers the verdict to Maha Mantri who gives the death sentence to him. To protect her love Parvathi makes a play by speaking in the voice of a goddess, standing behind the statue, and proclaiming Chandrasena as innocent. Ultimately, the King too believes it and acquits Chandrasena. Simultaneously, Veera Mohan is affirmed as a traitor and ostracized from the kingdom when Rajani also accompanies him. Thereafter, Chandrasena marries Parvathi when she realizes the nefarious face of her husband. At that point, Chandrasena captures Rajani and tries to molest her. Learning it, Parvathi lands, and being necessitated she slays him out. At the same time, Rajaguru tries to kill the King when Veera Mohan in disguise saves him, but Rajaguru cleverly throws the blame on Veera Mohan and he is accused. Just before judgment, Parvathi arrives and brings out the real face of Rajaguru when he slaughters her. At last, the enraged public stamps out Rajaguru. Finally, the movie ends on a happy note with the marriage of Veera Mohan & Rajani.

Cast
N. T. Rama Rao as Veera Mohan
Krishna Kumari as Rajani
Jamuna as Parvathi
Jaggayya as Chandra Senudu
Relangi as Kailasam 
Ramana Reddy as Vengallaraya Deva
Gummadi as Rajaguru 
Peketi Sivaram as Patalam
K. V. S. Sarma as Maha Mantri 
Girija as Champakam
E. V. Saroja as Dancer 
Rama Devi as Kailasam's mother

Soundtrack

Music composed by Susarla Dakshinamurthi. Lyrics were written by Aarudhra. Music released on Audio Company.

References

External links
 

1957 films
1950s Telugu-language films
Films scored by Susarla Dakshinamurthi